Jerry Paul Fontenot (born November 21, 1966) is an American football coach and former center who played in the National Football League for the Chicago Bears, New Orleans Saints and Cincinnati Bengals. He attended Texas A&M University.

Fontenot served as an assistant offensive line coach and tight ends coach for the Green Bay Packers from 2006 to 2015. On January 19, 2016, Fontenot was fired. In 2019, he became offensive line coach for the Los Angeles Wildcats of the XFL.

References

1966 births
Living people
American football centers
Chicago Bears players
Cincinnati Bengals players
Los Angeles Wildcats coaches
Green Bay Packers coaches
New Orleans Saints players
Texas A&M Aggies football players
Players of American football from Louisiana
Sportspeople from Lafayette, Louisiana